"You Can't Change That" is a song by Raydio from their second studio album Rock On. Released as a single in 1979, it reached #9 on the US Billboard Hot 100 chart and #3 on the soul chart.

Critical reception
Robert Hilburn of the Los Angeles Times called "You Can't Change That" a "good natured" tune that's one of "the album's high points". Craig Lytle of AllMusic also called the song "a laid-back yet very danceable track; it features the vocals of the mild-tempered Ray Parker Jr. and the distinctive tenor of Arnell Carmichael." Record World said it has a "a bit of a Spinners feel."

Personnel

Raydio
Arnell Carmichael – vocals
Ray Parker Jr. – vocals, keyboards, synthesizers

Additional personnel
Jack Ashford – percussion
Ollie E. Brown – drums, percussion, vocals
Charles Fearing – guitars
Larry Tolbert – drums, percussion
Cheryl Brown, Darren Carmichael, Valorie Jones, Francis Pearlman – background vocals

Chart history

Weekly charts

Year-end charts

References

External links
 Lyrics of this song

1979 singles
Ray Parker Jr. songs
Songs written by Ray Parker Jr.
Arista Records singles
1979 songs